Now and Forever is a 1983 Australian drama film directed by Adriane Carr and starring Cheryl Ladd, Robert Coleby and Carmen Duncan. The screenplay concerns a seemingly perfect couple, whose marriage is destroyed when the husband is accused of rape by another woman. It was based on a 1978 novel by Danielle Steel.

Cast
 Cheryl Ladd - Jessie Clarke
 Robert Coleby - Ian Clarke
 Carmen Duncan - Astrid Bonner
 Christine Amor - Margaret Burton
 Aileen Britton - Bethanie
 Alex Scott - Andrew Wundham
 Kris McQuade - Matilda Spencer
 John Allen - Martin Harrington
 Rod Mullinar - Geoffrey Bates
 Kevin Healy - Jock Martin
 Michael Long - William Horton
 Tim Burns - Kent Adams
 Henri Szeps - Barry York
 Redmond Phillips - Judge
 Amanda Ma - Kit
 Sarah De Teliga - Zina
 Ray Marshall - Harvey Green
 Paul Bertram - James Eaton
 Alan Tobin - Wayne Buttery
 Reg Gillam - Magistrate

References

External links

Now and Forever at Oz Movies

1983 films
Australian drama films
1983 drama films
Films based on works by Danielle Steel
1980s English-language films
1980s Australian films